Anacaena lutescens is a species of water scavenger beetle in the family Hydrophilidae. It is found in Africa, Europe and Northern Asia (excluding China), and North America.

References

Further reading

External links

 

Hydrophilinae
Articles created by Qbugbot
Beetles described in 1829